Zhuguang Road is a station on Line 17 of the Shanghai Metro. It opened with the rest of Line 17 on 30 December 2017. The station was previously named China Exposition North while it was under construction.

History 
The station opened for passenger trial operation on 30 December 2017, concurrent with the opening of the rest of Line 17. During the planning and construction stages, the station was named China Exposition North, so named because it is located north of the National Convention and Exhibition Center.

Station description 

Like all stations on Line 17, Zhuguang Road station is fully accessible. The platform area consists of a single island platform located underground, beneath a concourse level, which has two service counters, one at each end. There are fare controls at both the west and east ends of the concourse level. The platform area can be accessed by elevator from the concourse area within the fare-paid zone. The street level and concourse level are connected by an elevator near Exit 3, at the western end of the station. Toilets are located at the platform level within the fare-paid zone, at the east end of the platform.

The station itself is located in the eastern part of Qingpu District, beneath the Songze Elevated Road along Songze Avenue, between Zhuguang Road and Panxiu Road. The station is located very close to the boundary with Minhang District.

The station is known for its design elements. Although an underground station, sunshine flows easily to the platform level via a panoramic sunroof, which covers the entire ceiling. These columns were instead placed between the platform and the tracks, also serving as pilasters for the platform screen doors. Porcelain art pieces are on display between the platform screen doors.

In July 2018 the station won the LEED (Leadership in Energy and Environmental Design) silver prize, the most widely used green building rating system in the world, making it the first of all Metro stations in Asia to win the title.

Exits 
There are three exits of the station, one of which remains closed:
 Exit 1: Songze Avenue (temporarily closed)
 Exit 2: Zhuguang Road
 Exit 3: Panxiu Road

Nearby landmarks 
The station is located just northwest of the National Convention and Exhibition Center, which was the venue for the China International Import Expo in November 2018.
Line 2, however this station is not considered an interchange station with Zhuguang Road Station.

References 

Railway stations in Shanghai
Shanghai Metro stations in Qingpu District
Railway stations in China opened in 2017
Line 17, Shanghai Metro